Edgar George McIldowie Lansbury (born 12 January 1930) is a British-born Irish-American theatre, film, and television producer.

Early life
Born in London, Lansbury is the son of Belfast-born actress Moyna Macgill and Edgar Lansbury, a British politician and businessman and the grandson of future Labour Party leader George Lansbury. He is the younger brother of actress Angela Lansbury and the twin brother of television producer Bruce Lansbury; both brothers became United States citizens in 1954.

Career
Lansbury's first Broadway production, the 1964 Frank D. Gilroy play The Subject Was Roses, won him the Tony Award for Best Play. Other Broadway credits include Promenade (1969, co-produced with Joseph Beruh), The Only Game in Town, Look to the Lilies, The Magic Show, the 1974 revival of Gypsy starring his sister, Godspell, American Buffalo (which earned him a nomination for the Drama Desk Award for Outstanding Play), and Lennon.

Off-Broadway Lansbury has produced, among other productions, revivals of Arms and the Man, Waiting for Godot, and Long Day's Journey into Night, and the comedy As Bees In Honey Drown, which earned him a second Drama Desk Award nomination.

Lansbury is the recipient of the John Houseman Award, presented to him by The Acting Company to honor his commitment to the development of classical actors and a national audience for the theater.

Lansbury's film credits include The Wild Party, Blue Sunshine, and Squirm and the screen adaptations of The Subject Was Roses and Godspell. He produced the television series Coronet Blue, which was broadcast by CBS in 1967.

Personal life
He was the father-in-law of Ally Sheedy, who was married to his son, actor David Lansbury, from 1992 to 2008.

References

External links

Edgar Lansbury at the Lortel Archives

1930 births
Living people
American theatre managers and producers
Film producers from New York (state)
Television producers from New York City
English theatre managers and producers
English film producers
English television producers
Tony Award winners
People with acquired American citizenship
Lansbury family